Cunningham is a young crater on the western floor of the Caloris Basin, on Mercury. It is surrounded by a bright ray system.

The crater's name was adopted by the International Astronomical Union (IAU) in 2008, shortly after its discovery on the first flyby of MESSENGER. It is named for the American photographer Imogen Cunningham.

References

Impact craters on Mercury